Levator Boatworks is a manufacturer of racing shells.

History 

Levator Boatworks Limited was launched in 1994, by boat builder - 
designer Jurgen Kaschper in  London, Ontario, Canada. The company 
builds three series of single rowing racing shells.

The Racer Series are composite material boats designed for   
competitive racing rowing clubs and individuals.

The InStep Series are composite racing singles designed with   
Levator's innovation: the ergonomic InStep system that increases   
stability and reduces the amount of tuck required to get in and out  
of the shell. Levator Boatworks successfully developed the INstep 
system in 1996.  This award-winning innovation changes  the
cockpit design by lowering the centre portion of the seat deck to   
the keel to lower the center of gravity of the rower stepping into   
the boat. The INstep project was a collaboration between Levator and 
the University of Waterloo-Faculty of Architecture.

The Mahogany Series are  advanced hybrid  wooden shells, which combine 
modern  carbon/kevlar/ with mahogany veneers. Levator Boatworks is one 
of the remaining commercial wooden rowing shell manufacturers 
remaining in the world.

In 2007, the Levator Boatworks moved its production facilities to   
Dorchester, Ontario, east of London.

External links 
 Levator Boatworks Ltd.

Rowing equipment manufacturers